Schizothorax ninglangensis is a species of ray-finned fish in the genus Schizothorax, from Lugu Lake, Ninglang, Yunnan.

References

Schizothorax
Fish described in 1981